Taylor Rooks (born May 22, 1992) is an American sports journalist and broadcaster. She currently appears on Thursday Night Football, Bleacher Report and Turner Sports. Before joining the Turner networks, she was a host, reporter, and correspondent at SportsNet New York. Prior to the New York Market, she worked for the Big Ten Network. She appeared on BTN Live, BTN Football Pregame, and Women's Sports Report. She was a sideline reporter for CBS Sports Network for the 2016-2017 football season. Prior to SNY, CBS, and BTN, Rooks was a football and basketball recruiting reporter for scout.com. She has an on-air presence for major events, such as the Big Ten Football Championship.

Early life and family
Rooks attended Peachtree Ridge High School in Suwanee, Georgia, from which she graduated in 2010.

Rooks decided to follow in her parents' footsteps by attending the University of Illinois at Urbana-Champaign where she majored in broadcast journalism. During her time at the University of Illinois, Rooks covered and broke national football/basketball recruiting stories while working with Scout.com. She appeared on CBS Sports Network reporting on the WBB Pre-NIT Championship at 19 years old. Throughout college, she interned with the PGA Tour, Comcast SportsNet Chicago, and Fox Sports/Scout.com. She received numerous scholarships in her time in Champaign, and helped expand women's interest in broadcasting. Rooks modeled briefly, but turned her focus to sports journalism.

Rooks comes from a family of athletes. She is the daughter of Thomas Rooks, top rushing leader for the Illinois Fighting Illini; the niece of St. Louis Cardinals Hall of Famer, Lou Brock; and the niece of former Pittsburgh Steelers and New Orleans Saints NFL player, Marv Woodson. Also the sister of Ryan Rooks, a graduate of the University of Georgia, and a former swimmer and cheerleader.

Career
From August 2012 to May 2014, Rooks worked with scout.com covering Illinois football and basketball. She made national news with her stories and perspective on the game - specifically in recruiting. Rooks broke multiple stories regarding Cliff Alexander, Jalen Brunson, Quentin Snider, Aaron Jordan, Charles Matthews, and Jayson Tatum.

In August 2014—two months out of college—Rooks became an on-air host, reporter, and correspondent for the Big Ten Network.
She appeared nightly on the popular sports television show, BTN Live, alongside Dave Revsine, Mike Hall, and Rick Pizzo, and analysts such as Jim Jackson, Chuck Long, and Glen Mason. One of her roles is to interact with fans and bring their social media topics onto the screen. Rooks regularly reports on Big Ten Games throughout the season, and travels frequently for television shows. She hosts the Women's Sports Report, alongside Lisa Byington, covering all women's sports in the Big Ten.

In August 2016, Rooks became the newest host, reporter, and anchor for SportsNet New York. Rooks is also a sideline reporter for CBS Sports Network for the 2016-2017 college football season.

She has established a large following on social media platforms, such as Twitter and Instagram.

References

External links
1070thefan.com
Foxsports.com
[Look] Sideline Reporter Taylor Rooks Is Heating Up Social Right Now
Introducing BTN Live's Newest Member Taylor Rooks
Rumor Control: Taylor Rooks Source Confirms Whether Or Not She’s Letting Light-Eyed Jesse Williams Love Up On Her

1992 births
American sports journalists
African-American women journalists
African-American journalists
Living people
Sports commentators
American television sports anchors
Women sports announcers
University of Illinois Urbana-Champaign College of Media alumni
American television journalists
American women television journalists
21st-century African-American people
21st-century African-American women